DEKRA is the world’s largest non-listed expert organization in the TIC sector (Testing, Inspection, Certification) founded in Berlin, Germany in 1925 as Deutscher Kraftfahrzeug-Überwachungs-Verein (German Motor Vehicle Inspection Association). At 28 million per year worldwide, DEKRA inspects more vehicles than any other organization. DEKRA is active in the field in more than 20 countries across the globe, from Sweden to South Africa, from the U.S. to New Zealand. The latest additions were Finland, Mexico and Chile. With approximately 48,000 employees and revenues of more than  €3.5 billion, DEKRA is the largest inspection company in Germany and one of the world’s leading expert organizations.. By its own account, it is the European market leader. The group focuses on the inspection of vehicles and technical systems, but also offers other services like testing and certification. DEKRA has had its headquarters in Stuttgart since 1946. Business operations are carried out by DEKRA SE, which is wholly owned by DEKRA e. V. The vision for the company’s 100th birthday in 2025 is that DEKRA will be the global partner for a safe, secure and sustainable world. With a platinum rating from EcoVadis, DEKRA is in the top one percent of sustainable businesses ranked.

Tasks
DEKRA’s main tasks include the periodic inspection of motor vehicles (general inspection including emissions testing), expert appraisals, safety inspections and the inspection of technical systems.

Other products and services include damage reports, accident analyses and technical reports, industrial testing services, initial and in-service training, temporary work, outplacement, certifications, environmental protection, materials testing, product testing, building surveys, corporate consultancy and specialist publications. DEKRA’s range of services also includes safety engineering and occupational medicine support for businesses in accordance with professional association regulations. 
In former West Germany, DEKRA operates as an “officially recognised inspection organisation”. In former East Germany and Berlin, the association also has the status of a “technical testing centre for automobile traffic” with the accompanying expertise (including the conducting of driving tests and assessments for the purpose of obtaining operating licences).
DEKRA operates 480 branches throughout Germany and carries out regular vehicle inspections at 38,500 inspection sites (workshops).
The DEKRA Academy, which is responsible for initial and in-service training, is represented at 150 locations. It is one of the largest private training companies in Germany.

On November 1, 2017 DEKRA acquired the EuroSpeedway Lausitz as a test site, especially for autonomous driving.

Group structure
The DEKRA e. V. association has nearly 44,000 members. They are primarily companies with fleets of commercial vehicles, such as carriers, that are supported technically and commercially by DEKRA. The association also provides employee training for companies engaged in the safe transport of dangerous goods or substances.

DEKRA e. V. holds 100% of the shares in DEKRA SE. It acts as a holding company for the subsidiaries organised into the following three business units: 
 DEKRA Automotive (vehicle inspection, expert appraisals, used car management, homologation and type testing, consultancy and workshop tests, claims services) 
 DEKRA Industrial (construction and property, machinery and plant safety, environmental protection, occupational health and safety, energy and process industries, system certification, product testing and certification) 
 DEKRA Personnel (qualification, temporary work, outplacement and recruitment)

Overall, the group has more than 230 subsidiaries and holdings in over 50 countries.

Key figures
In fiscal year 2021, the expert organization achieved sales of €3.5 billion. At the end of 2021, Dekra employed around 48,000 people across the Group.

History

DEKRA was founded in Berlin in 1925 as Deutscher Kraftfahrzeug-Überwachungs-Verein (German Motor Vehicle Inspection Association). When National Socialists come to power in 1933, DEKRA follows a consciously neutral course with regard to the National Socialist state and the Nazi Party under the management of Kurt Möhring. From 1937, DEKRA can no longer maintain its neutral course with regard to the National Socialist regime and is forced to organize itself within the state-controlled trade association “Reichsverkehrsgruppe Kraftfahrgewerbe” (Reich Transport Group for the Motor Vehicle Industry) In World War II, the majority of DEKRA engineers are drafted into the Wehrmacht (German Armed Forces).

Starting in 1942, the focal point of orders shifts from vehicle inspection to damage and time estimates. After World War II, former DEKRA engineers resume the company's work in 1946. Stuttgart becomes the new location of the head office. After the introduction of the main vehicle inspection in 1951.

In 1961, DEKRA was recognised as an official inspection association. The first DEKRA training centre was opened in Wart in 1974. DEKRA AG was founded in 1990 and took over the work of the association. DEKRA ETS was founded in 1991 and took on technical safety, materials testing and construction tasks. DEKRA Umwelt was founded in 1993 in cooperation with the Kölnische Rückversicherung reinsurance company. Further partnerships followed in Eastern Europe beginning in 1993. On 13 July 2010, DEKRA AG was renamed DEKRA SE (Societas Europaea), becoming a European Company.

From 2003 to 2021, DEKRA has been the official sponsor of the referees of the German Football Association (DFB). DEKRA attained a high level of global recognition between 1990 and 1999 as Formula 1 driver Michael Schumacher's exclusive advertising partner and continue recently with Nico Hülkenberg. DEKRA has been the technical partner and sponsor of DTM (German Touring Car Championship) since 1989.

SafetyCheck
DEKRA offers free visual and functional inspection in all of its branches under the name SafetyCheck during a promotion period in the spring of each year. The vehicle inspection does not fulfil the requirements of Section 29 of the German Road Traffic Licensing Regulations (StVZO) and has no effect on the inspection sticker.

References

External links
 DEKRA International website

German companies established in 1925
1925 establishments in Germany
Product certification
Companies based in Stuttgart
Automotive safety
Road transport